The Entente Sannois Saint-Gratien is a French association football team based in the suburb of Saint-Gratien in Paris. The team was founded in 1989 and play in the Championnat National 3, the country's fifth tier of competition.

Recent history
Recent seasons have seen the team struggle, both on and off the pitch. Following many years in the French 3rd division during which time they were denied promotion to Ligue 2 by an administrative error at the league in the mid-2000s (for which they were awarded financial compensation), they were relegated at the end of the 2008–09 season and started season 2009–10 in the Championnat de France Amateur. In June 2011, L'Entente was relegated again (this time to the CFA 2), after the club entered bankruptcy protection. With promotions in 2014 and 2017, the club rose again to the third tier, but suffered relegations again in 2019 and 2022.

Chairmen
 2009–2011: Vikash Dhorasoo
 2011–2013: Patrick Gangloff
 2013–2018: Christian Fouché
 2018–2019: Patrick Gangloff

Stadium
The team play their home games at the Parc des Sports Michel Hidalgo, located on the border between the Sannois and Saint-Gratien suburbs of Paris. Though the stadium has a capacity of just under 8000, the average attendances for Entente matches is considerably lower than this, and has been declining with the team's fortunes over the last few years.

Current squad

Coaches
 Didier Caignard (1997 – October 2005)
 Laurent Croci (October 2005 – May 2006)
 Kamel Djabour (June 2006)
 Julio Moreno (Juni 2006 – January 2007)
 Kamel Djabour (January 2007 June 2009)
 Adrian Suka (June 2009 – 2011)
 Vincent Bordot (2011)
 Bruno Naidon (2012)
 Philippe Araujo (2012)
 Vincent Bordot (2013–)

References

External links
  

 
 
Association football clubs established in 1989
1989 establishments in France
Football clubs in Île-de-France
Sport in Val-d'Oise